Christina Persighetti (6 July 1936 – 31 October 2012) was a British athlete. She competed in the women's long jump at the 1960 Summer Olympics.

References

1936 births
2012 deaths
Athletes (track and field) at the 1960 Summer Olympics
British female long jumpers
Olympic athletes of Great Britain
Place of birth missing